Kent Television (KTV) is the student-led television society at the University of Kent, Canterbury and is a media division of the university's student union, Kent Union. KTV was founded in May 2012 and within its first year has gone on to win 3 awards at NaSTA 2013, worked with the SU (Kent Union) and the university to gain a new Student Media Centre on the university campus and hit over 125,000 views on its YouTube Channel. Currently the channel has 250,000 views and over 700 subscribers, along with an additional 2 more awards at NaSTA 2015.

History 

KTV was founded by Robert Linton and David Horler early 2012. Initially, it was set up because they both found there was no society on campus that just let people go out and film things and make shows/films. With the help of Kent Union and Mel Lewis (Student Media Manager 2011 – 2013) KTV became a society in April 2012, and the first video was uploaded on 17 May 2012 and can be found here. At the end of the 2011/12 academic year KTV had also covered both of the big music festivals on campus Keynestock and the Kent Union Summerball.

2012/13 

At the beginning of the 2012/13 academic year KTV launched with a massive freshers campaign on-line and on-campus, by having a huge presence on Facebook and Twitter and recording freshers shows outside in the centre of campus for all to see. Still a new society, though making its first steps to Student Media status, this method was used to gain view, followers, subscribers and likes but also to gain a new membership. The membership was around 12 at the end of the last term but grew to around 40 within the first few weeks of term, and as of March 2013 the membership stands at exactly 50.

During this year KTV covered many event at the university including Varsity and the Union Elections. Both of these events were broadcast live to a large audience, utilising the JANET System.

KTV also hosted and organised a charity event alongside CSR 97.4FM (Canterbury Student Radio) and InQuire (UKC Student Newspaper) entitled Going Live for Catching Lives, shortened to Awakefor48. This was a 48hr live student media marathon in which both the radio station and KTV simultaneously went live for 48 hours to raise money for a local homeless charity, Catching Lives. This event brought together all three student media groups, and was our first ever live broadcast, raising over £1500.

Although throughout the year KTV covered many events they did start producing some original content, such as KTV Cookbook, KTV News, Second Choice (sitcom written by KTV Members) and a series of short features for Christmas 2012.

KTV also joined the National Student Television Association (NaSTA) and at the 2013 awards and conference hosted by XTV they won 3 awards.

In the Summer Term KTV returned to Keynestock (UKC Music Festival) and broadcast the whole 9 hour music festival live.

2013/14 

For the academic year 2013/14 KTV moved to a new student media centre on campus at the university. A new committee structure was also implemented and they were elected in May 2013.

During the first term KTV saw a massive increase in membership numbers and therefore an increase in content. During 2012/13 KTV produced 100 videos over the year however in the year 2013/14 KTV produced over 140 videos within 9 months.

In 2014, KTV branched out into producing short films and dramas through a newly formed section of student media: KTV Drama. These included First Draft, A Dream for the Dead, Encryption and Beat to Windward. These productions have been very successful in terms of engaging members and a new audiences.

KTV has also expanded its live broadcast capability and therefore KTV has seen an increase in live broadcasts. In 2015, KTV hosted and broadcast the Kent Union Leadership Elections Candidate Question Time, in which over three nights KTV questioned all the potential sabbatical officers and opened it up to the world by allowing questions from social media. Overall the coverage reached over 5,000 people across the world.

2014/15

2015/16

2016/17

2017/18

2018/19

2019/20

2022/23

Awards 

NaSTA Awards

Kent Union Awards

References

External links 
 KTV Official Website
Kent Union – Student Media

British student media groups
Student television stations in the United Kingdom
University of Kent